The Macquarie River - Wambuul is part of the Macquarie–Barwon catchment within the Murray–Darling basin, is one of the main inland rivers in New South Wales, Australia.

The river rises in the central highlands of New South Wales near the town of Oberon and travels generally northwest past the towns of Bathurst, Wellington, Dubbo, Narromine, and Warren to the Macquarie Marshes. The Macquarie Marshes then drain into the Darling River via the lower Barwon River.

Lake Burrendong is a large reservoir with capacity of  located near Wellington which impounds the waters of the Wambuul Macquarie River and its tributaries the Cudgegong River and the Turon River for flood control and irrigation.

Name
The Wiradjuri are the people of the three rivers, Wambuul, Kalare (Lachlan) and the Murrumbidjeri (Murrumbidgee). Wambuul means winding river, and included the tributary Fish River. It has also been spelt Wambool.

The river was first documented for the British crown near Bathurst by European explorer, George Evans in 1812, who named the river in honour of Lieutenant-Colonel Lachlan Macquarie, who served as the last autocratic Governor of the Colony of New South Wales, from 1810 to 1821.

In December 2021 Wambuul was recognised as an official dual name by the Geographical Names Board of New South Wales after support from a local movement and the Bathurst Local Aboriginal Land Council. Either or both names may be used and both are given equal status.

Geography
Windamere dam, on the Cudgegong River, is operated in conjunction with Burrendong.

Sources
It is a combination of two water systems which are the overflow from Chifley Dam which is fed by the Campbells River, and the Fish River which flows into and out of the Oberon Dam.

Tributaries
A number of rivers and creeks flow into the Wambuul Macquarie River, with descending elevation as follows:

Communities and bridge crossings along the river

Catchment

Over 72% of land is flat, with an additional 17% undulating to hilly. The remainder is steep to mountainous, rising progressively to elevations above . To the east the boundary is formed by the Great Dividing Range. This boundary extends from near Oberon in the south to Coolah in the north.

From Bathurst, near the formation of the river, it passes through the following geographic areas:
 Bathurst Plains, undulating country of  elevation surrounded by high tablelands on all sides. This includes an extensive floodplain around Bathurst
past Hill End Plateau, where it is joined from the east by the Turon River, the river drains a plateau extending from near Portland to Sofala. This area is predominantly rugged slopes.
Burrendong Dam, the Macquarie River is joined from the east by the Cudgegong River, which rises in the hills around Rylstone with a general elevation around 
through Wellington and Dubbo where the river is joined by the Bell and Little Rivers. Between Wellington and Dubbo extensive flat areas are evident.
north of Dubbo, the Talbragar River joins the Macquarie. The Talbragar is the most important downstream tributary. This river rises in mountainous country at the junction of the Great Dividing Range and the Liverpool Range. The country through which the Talbragar River runs is broad and flat, bordered by undulating hills that disperse as the river nears Dubbo.
north of Dubbo, the river passes through flat plains flowing north-west through Narromine and Warren. A complex series of effluent creeks connect the Macquarie, Darling and Bogan Rivers.
Macquarie Marshes lie at the end of the river channel proper. Near Carinda, the Macquarie is joined by Marthaguy Creek which drains an area  and carries spill-over water from the Macquarie and Castlereagh Rivers during floods.

Rainfall
Rainfall varies across the catchment of the Macquarie River. Generally the peaks and tablelands receive higher rainfall due to the shadowing effects of the surrounding ranges. This is distributed relatively uniformly throughout the year.

Rainfall can vary dramatically over several years. For example, records show a variation from >200% to <50% of the average annual figure.

Statistics

History

Aboriginal history
The Wiradjuri people are the original inhabitants of the area that includes the Macquarie River catchment. The Wiradjuri knew the river as the Wambool, which means "winding river". The noted Wiradjuri warrior Windradyne came from the upper Macquarie River region, and was fatally wounded from a gun shot after a man hunt was commissioned by the crown in 1829. Near Carinda, between the Macquarie River and Marra Creek, the oldest evidence of bread making in the world (approximately 30,000 years old) was found at an ancient lake known as Cuddie Springs.

European history
The upper reaches of the Macquarie River were first seen by Europeans in 1813 and the river was named in honour of the then Governor of the Colony of New South Wales, Lieutenant-Colonel (later Major-General) Lachlan Macquarie. In 1813 Deputy Surveyor of Lands and explorer, George Evans wrote in his journal:
30 November 1813: I have at length reached the Ridge I so much wished to do after walking about 2 Miles, where I had a prospect to the North for a great distance; A Mist arises from a part I suppose to be a River or a large Lagoon about 20 Miles Off; and on 9 December 1813: I have called the Main Stream "Macquarie River".

Two years later Governor Macquarie inspected the country surrounding Bathurst and the Macquarie River and wrote on 10 June 1815, on his return to Government House in Sydney: 
At the distance of seven miles from the bridge over the Campbell River, Bathurst Plains open to the view, presenting a rich tract of campaign country of 11 miles in length, bounded on both sides by gently rising and very beautiful hills, thinly wooded. The Macquarie River, which is constituted by the junction of the Fish and Campbell River, takes a winding course through the plains, which can be easily traced from the high lands adjoining by the particular verdure of the trees on its bank, which are likewise the only trees throughout the extent of the plains. The level and clear surface of these plains gives them at first view very much the appearance of lands in a state of cultivation. It is impossible to behold this grand scene without a feeling of admiration and surprise, whilst the silence and solitude, which reign in a space of such extent and beauty as seems designed by nature for the occupancy and comfort of man, create a degree of melancholy in the mind which may be more easily imagined than described. 

During 1817 and 1818, explorer John Oxley was commissioned to explore the course of the Lachlan and Macquarie rivers respectively. Writing in his journal, published in 1820, Oxley described the junction of the two rivers:
The river in Wellington Valley had been swelled by the late rains, insomuch that the water below its junction with the Macquarie was quite discoloured. From the fineness of the soil, the rain had made the ground very soft, rendering it difficult for the horses to travel.....  Our day's journey lay generally over an open forest country, with rich flats on either side of the river .... The river had many fine reaches, extending in straight lines from one to three miles, and of a corresponding breadth. The rapids, although frequent, offered no material obstruction to the boats. The current in the long reaches was scarcely perceptible .... The river expanded into beautiful reaches, having great depth of water, and from two to three hundred feet broad, literally covered with water-fowl of different kinds: the richest flats bordered the river, apparently more extensive on the south side. The vast body of water which this river must contain in times of flood is confined within exterior banks, and its inundations are thus deprived of mischief..... The trees were of the eucalyptus (apple tree), and on the hills a few of the callitris macrocarpa [Note: Callitr. Vent decad.] were seen.... The main bed of the river was much contracted, but very deep, the waters spreading to the depth of a foot or eighteen inches over the banks, but all running on the same point of bearing. After going about twenty miles, we lost the land and trees: the channel of the river, which lay through reeds, and was from one to three feet deep, ran northerly. This continued for three or four miles farther, when although there had been no previous change in the breadth, depth, and rapidity of the stream for several miles, and I was sanguine in my expectations of soon entering the long sought for Australian sea, it all at once eluded our farther pursuit by spreading on every point from north-west to north-east, among the ocean of reeds which surrounded us, still running with the same rapidity as before. There, was no channel whatever among those reeds, and the depth varied from three to five feet. This astonishing change (for I cannot call it a termination of the river), of course left me no alternative but to endeavour to return to some spot, on which we could effect a landing before dark.... To assert positively that we were on the margin of the lake or sea into which this great body of water is discharged, might reasonably be deemed a conclusion which has nothing but conjecture for its basis; but if an opinion may be permitted to be hazarded from actual appearances, mine is decidedly in favour of our being in the immediate vicinity of an inland sea, or lake, most probably a shoal one, and gradually filling up by immense depositions from the higher lands, left by the waters which flow into it. It is most singular, that the high-lands on this continent seem to be confined to the sea-coast, or not to extend to any great distance from it.

By 1828, explorer Charles Sturt was commissioned to ascertain "the limits of the Colony" by following the Macquarie River "for the express purpose of ascertaining the nature and extent of that basin into which the Macquarie was supposed to fall, and whether any connection existed between it and the streams falling westerly". Navigating the marshes (later named in honour of Lachlan Macquarie), Sturt was the first European to visit the Darling River, named in honour of General Ralph Darling.

Water management

Irrigation
The Macquarie River catchment is a regulated Water Management Area and includes private irrigation as well as several public irrigation schemes located at Narromine – Trangie, Buddah Lakes, Tenandra, Trangie – Nevertire, Nevertire, and Marthaguy.

The River is classified as over-subscribed

Flooding

The Macquarie River has a history of flooding. Some significant events are listed below. After major floods, water can flow past the Macquarie Marshes and into the Barwon-Darling river system upstream of Brewarrina.
1867devastating floods wash away the first Denison Bridge at Bathurst and also debris damages Ranken's Bridge
1955serious flooding of Macquarie River amongst other river systems
1979 heavy flooding of the low lying sections along the river
1986severe localised flooding in Bathurst
1990severe localised flooding in Bathurst
1998there was a large flood that affected the farming of cotton and vegetables. Bathurst was severely affected
2010November/December saw major flooding of the lower Macquarie River following heavy rainfall events throughout Eastern Australia
2016August/September saw moderate to major flooding along the entire river.

Recreation
Recreational activities are popular along the length of the river particularly in the communities it passes by.

FishingThe following species of fresh water fish can be caught: brown trout, carp, eel-tailed catfish, golden perch, murray cod, rainbow trout, redfin, silver perch, trout cod and yabbies.
Lake Burrendonga large dam very popular with water sports enthusiasts activities include skiing, jet skis, sailing, and general boating.
Parksin Bathurst along the bank of the river is Bi-Centennial Park. This park is used for recreation purposes, picnics, events, bicycle riding, etc. In Warren, Macquarie Park, off Burton St, has English-style formal gardens and a monument in honour of Oxley and Sturt who traced the course of the Macquarie River. Oxley camped near Warren in 1818 and is further commemorated in the naming of Oxley Park on the other side of the river. Sturt passed by just to the north-east in 1828 and the bridge over the river is named after him. Hundreds of galahs roost in the red gums at sunset. The adjacent Red River Gum Walk follows the riverbank around to a 500-year-old river gum adjacent the Warren Hole, a natural and permanent waterhole once used for swimming and fishing.

References

External links

 
 Daily river reportsNSW Government

Further reading
 

Tributaries of the Darling River
Newell Highway